The Mexico City International Tournament is the original name of the Mexican Open of Badminton that was promoted by both the Mexican Association of Badminton and the Centro Deportivo Chapultepec. The Mexican Open of Badminton is an international tournament organised in Mexico.

The first competition was organised in 1949; there were four more editions held in 1952, 1958, 1959 and 1961.

Since 1964, the tournament was officially called the Mexican National Open Championship.

However, in 2009, the Mexican Association of Badminton decided to start counting the event as a new one; hence, the 2014 Mexican Open is considered as the fifth Mexican Open.

The Mexican Open is one of the most important Latin American Badminton Championships together with the Pan American Badminton Championships and Pan American Games.

Winners 

Badminton tournaments in Mexico